The Second Pashinyan government was the executive branch of the government of Armenia from 14 January 2019 to 2 August 2021. Nikol Pashinyan was appointed Prime Minister by President Armen Sarkissian on 14 January 2019, after My Step Alliance's decisive victory in the 2018 Armenian parliamentary election.

The Government was formed by the My Step Alliance, which consisted of the Civil Contract Party and the much smaller Mission Party.

The National Assembly approved a reduction to 12 ministries from the previous 17.

Structure

Governing staff

References 

Politics of Armenia
Political organizations based in Armenia
Government of Armenia
European governments
Cabinets established in 2019
Nikol Pashinyan
2019 establishments in Armenia